The Slingsby T.41 Skylark 2 was a sailplane produced from 1953 by Slingsby Sailplanes at Kirkbymoorside, Yorkshire.

Design and development
Following the technical success of the T.37 Skylark, the concept was expanded with the introduction of the T.41 Skylark 2. The use of laminar-flow sections was continued but the section at the tips was changed to NACA4415 to reduce the tendency to tip-stall. The Skylark 2 was very similar in shape to its predecessor but had a smooth-skinned rounded fuselage and a wing of greater span and area. Composite materials were introduced in the Skylark 2, with the nose cone, wingtips and various small fairings made from polyester resin glassfibre. The thickness of the aerofoils was increased to ensure that drag was reduced over a wider speed range allowing the Skylark 2 to climb faster in thermals at low speed and race between thermals at high speed.

History
The prototype was flown in November 1953 and tested by the British Gliding Association's Test Group No.1 based at Lasham Airfield. Results of the tests showed that the Skylark 2 was a safe aircraft with a reasonable performance. Orders were received from individuals, clubs and syndicates, but the Skylark 2 was soon outclassed in international competitions.

Specifications (Skylark 2)

See also

Notes

References

1950s British sailplanes
Glider aircraft
T.41 Skylark 2
Aircraft first flown in 1953
High-wing aircraft